George Henry Prosser (ca.1867 – 22 August 1941) was a businessman and politician in South Australia.

History
George Prosser was born at Gawler River and was a student at the Grote Street school.

He was a member of the Adelaide City Council for 27 years, and an alderman in 1933. He was mayor of the Town of Kensington and Norwood from 1907 to 1912. He was a member of the Chamber of Commerce, and served as president. He was a director of  Wallaroo-Mount Lyell Fertilisers Ltd. and chairman  1931–1933. He was also on the board of Adelaide Cement and Wilkinson & Co., Ltd, Elder's Trustee and Executor Co. Ltd.

He was a member of the Legislative Council for Central District No. 2 from 1921 to 1933.

He was captain of the Marryatville Bowling Club.

Family
On 29 November 1893 he married Emalia Rosa "Emily" Robinson in November 1893. They had two daughters:
Gladys Prosser (30 October 1894 – ) married Charles Ashley Foale (1884–1938) on 6 June 1917. Gladys was an accomplished singer.
Joyce Prosser (22 December 1901 – ) married Leslie Carrington Maiden BDS on 15 July 1926
They had homes "Ralston", Northumberland Road, Marryatville; and "Ralston", 11 Stannington Avenue, Heathpool.

References 

Members of the South Australian Legislative Council
Australian businesspeople
1867 births
1941 deaths
Liberal and Country League politicians
Mayors of places in South Australia